Eric Wohlberg (born January 8, 1965 in Sudbury, Ontario) is a Canadian former professional racing cyclist. He competed for his native country at three consecutive Summer Olympics, starting in 1996. Wohlberg won two medals at the 1998 Commonwealth Games in Kuala Lumpur, Malaysia. He also won the Tour of the Gila in 2000. He is also a multi-time Canadian National Time Trial Champion. He still races as an amateur against regional professionals in Northern California & Nevada. He is a directeur sportif (DS) for Rally Cycling.

Major results

1995
 1st Overall Tour de Beauce
1996
 National Road Championships
1st  Time trial
2nd Road race
 1st Overall Tour de Hokkaido
1997
 National Road Championships
1st  Time trial
2nd Road race
 1st Stage 1 (ITT) Tour de Langkawi
 1st Overall Hotter'N Hell Hundred
1st Stages 2 & 3
 1st Stage 1 Tour de Toona
1998
 1st  Time trial, National Road Championships
 Commonwealth Games
1st  Time trial
3rd  Road race
 1st Stage 6 Tour de Toona
 2nd Overall Hotter'N Hell Hundred
1st Stage 3
1999
 1st  Time trial, Pan American Road Championships
 1st  Time trial, National Road Championships
 1st Overall Hotter'N Hell Hundred
1st Stage 3
 1st Overall Tour of Somerville
 1st Stage 8 Tour de Langkawi
 1st Prologue & Stage 4a Tour de Beauce
 9th Overall Herald Sun Tour
2000
 National Road Championships
1st  Time trial
5th Road race
 1st Overall Tour of the Gila
 1st Overall Tour de Hokkaido
 1st Stage 3 Hotter'N Hell Hundred
 3rd Overall Fitchburg Longsjo Classic
1st Stage 1
 4th Overall Herald Sun Tour
1st Stage 11 (ITT)
2001
 1st  Time trial, National Road Championships
 1st Overall Fitchburg Longsjo Classic
1st Stage 1
 1st Overall Tour of Somerville
 1st 
 1st Stages 5 & 6 Tour of Southland 
 3rd Overall Tour de Toona
 6th Overall Herald Sun Tour
2002
 1st  Time trial, National Road Championships
 1st 
 1st 
 1st Stage 9 Tour of Southland
 5th Road race, Commonwealth Games
 7th Overall Herald Sun Tour
2003
 National Road Championships
1st  Time trial
3rd Road race
 1st Nevada City Classic
 1st 
 1st Stage 5 Herald Sun Tour
 2nd Overall Joe Martin Stage Race
1st Stage 1
 2nd Overall Tour of Queensland
1st Stage 1
 9th Overall Sea Otter Classic
 10th T-Mobile International
2004
 1st Overall Tour of Wellington
1st Stage 2a
 1st Stage 5 (ITT) Tour de Langkawi
 National Road Championships
2nd Time trial
5th Road race
 5th Overall Sea Otter Classic
 10th Overall Tour of Georgia
2005
 National Road Championships
2nd Road race
2nd Time trial
 5th Overall Redlands Bicycle Classic
2006
 1st Stage 3 (TTT) Vuelta a El Salvador
 2nd 
 3rd  Time trial, Pan American Road Championships
 National Road Championships
3rd Time trial
4th Road race
 6th Overall Vuelta Sonora
1st Stage 3
 7th Overall Tour de Hokkaido
2007
 1st Stages 1 & 4 (TTT) Vuelta a El Salvador
 8th Overall Herald Sun Tour
2008
 1st Stage 3 
 National Road Championships
4th Road race
5th Time trial
 6th US Air Force Cycling Classic

References

1965 births
Living people
Canadian track cyclists
Canadian male cyclists
Cyclists at the 1996 Summer Olympics
Cyclists at the 1998 Commonwealth Games
Cyclists at the 1999 Pan American Games
Cyclists at the 2000 Summer Olympics
Cyclists at the 2004 Summer Olympics
Olympic cyclists of Canada
Sportspeople from Greater Sudbury
Commonwealth Games gold medallists for Canada
Commonwealth Games bronze medallists for Canada
Pan American Games gold medalists for Canada
Commonwealth Games medallists in cycling
Pan American Games medalists in cycling
Medalists at the 1999 Pan American Games
Medallists at the 1998 Commonwealth Games